Jerry Crasnick is an American sportswriter and baseball executive. He is a senior advisor to the Major League Baseball Players Association. Previously, he wrote for the sports website ESPN.com, the Biddeford Journal Tribune, the Portland Press Herald, and The Cincinnati Post.

Early life and education
Crasnick is from Munjoy Hill in Portland, Maine. Crasnick received his bachelor's degree in Communications from Boston University.

Career
Crasnick began his career working for the Biddeford Journal Tribune in Maine, as well as the Portland Press Herald. In 1988, Crasnick served as the beat writer for The Cincinnati Post where he covered the Cincinnati Reds. During his time as beat writer, Crasnick covered Pete Rose and his suspension from Major League Baseball. Crasnick also covered the Reds' 1990 World Series championship, and five years of Marge Schott's tenure as owner of the Reds.  He has worked for The Denver Post and Bloomberg News, while also writing for The Sporting News and Baseball America.

In addition to his website and newspaper work, Crasnick is the author of the book License to Deal: A Season on the Run with a Maverick Baseball Agent. The book's main focus is on the story of Matt Sosnick who left his job as a chief executive officer to become a baseball agent.

Crasnick covered baseball for ESPN.com. In addition to his numerous articles, Crasnick often moderates baseball-themed chats and is a guest on ESPN podcasts.

In 2019, the Major League Baseball Players Association hired Crasnick as a senior advisor for media relations.

Personal life
Crasnick lives in Philadelphia, Pennsylvania with his wife and two daughters.

References

External links
 ESPN Home Page
 ESPN Insider Home Page
 Baseball America Home Page
 Jerry Crasnick Archive Page
 Jerry Crasnick Chat Archive Page
 Jerry Crasnick Twitter Home Page

Living people
1958 births
Baseball writers
American sportswriters
Boston University College of Communication alumni
Sportspeople from Portland, Maine
Writers from Portland, Maine